The Men's Australian Open 2011 is the men' edition of the 2011 Australian Open, which is a tournament of the PSA World Series event (Prize money : 150 000 $). The event took place in Canberra in Australia from 8 to 14 August. Ramy Ashour won his first Australian Open trophy, beating Nick Matthew in the final.

Prize money and ranking points
For 2011, the prize purse was $150,000. The prize money and points breakdown is as follows:

Seeds

Draw and results

See also
PSA World Tour 2011
PSA World Series 2011
Australian Open (squash)
2011 Women's Australian Open (squash)

References

External links
PSA Australian Open 2011 website
Australian Open official website

Squash tournaments in Australia
Australian Open Squash
2012 in Australian sport